IFK Mariestad  is a Swedish football team based in Mariestad currently playing in Division 3 Mellersta Götaland .

Background
IFK Mariestad was formed on the 18 December 1985 when the men's football section broke away from Mariestad Bois to form an independent club. Their home ground is at the Lekevi IP.

From its beginnings in Division 6 IFK have progressed slowly and followed their business plan with key objectives and milestones. The club's goal has always been to become an established Division 3 team and in 1999 this target was achieved. However as a newcomer in Division 3 the standard of football was found to be higher than expected and they were relegated back to Division 4 at the end of the season.

The club won Division 4 Västergötland Norra again in 2001 being undefeated throughout the season.  This time IFK spent two seasons in Division 3  Mellersta Götaland before relegation.  In the subsequent seasons iFK have been playing fifth tier football in the Swedish football league system.  In 2009 they were unfortunate to miss promotion by 2 points to Götene IF.

The club is affiliated to the Västergötlands Fotbollförbund.  The other main club in the town is Mariestads BK.

Season to season

Attendances

In recent seasons IFK Mariestad have had the following average attendances:

Footnotes

External links
 IFK Mariestad –  Official website

Association football clubs established in 1985
Football clubs in Västra Götaland County
1985 establishments in Sweden
Idrottsföreningen Kamraterna